Electric Callboy (formerly known as Eskimo Callboy) is a German electronicore band formed in Castrop-Rauxel in 2010. They take a more relaxed approach to the genre, and are known for their comedic songs, live shows and videos.

History

Early releases and Bury Me in Vegas (2010–2013) 

The first self-titled EP was self-released in 2010 and was distributed via EMP. Later the band re-released the EP via their actual recording label Redfield Records. The band was a support act for groups like Bakkushan, Callejon, Ohrbooten, We Butter the Bread with Butter and Neaera.

At festivals, the group shared stage with acts like Casper, Distance in Embrace and Rantanplan. In 2011 they played at Traffic Jam Open Air and Mair1 Festival. Their debut album, Bury Me in Vegas was released on 23 March 2012 worldwide via Redfield Records. Between 28 and 30 September 2012, the band toured Japan on the Geki Rock Tour. After Geki Rock the group toured China and Russian Federation. In October and November 2012 Electric Callboy was a support act alongside the Electro duo WassBass (founded by Nico of K.I.Z) for Callejon on their Blitzkreuz Tour, which lead through Germany and Austria. At the last show of the tour, at Live Music Hall in Cologne on 10 November 2012, nine fans were injured after pieces of the ceiling fell down in the moshpit area. The concert was stopped and rescheduled for 23 February 2013, at E-Werk in Cologne. The band did not appear on the new date because they were touring alongside The Browning, Close to Home and Intohimo through Europe during that time.

On 17 November 2012, the band announced after a concert in Düsseldorf that they were parting ways with their drummer Michael Maletzki; he was replaced by David Friedrich. In April 2013 the band toured the United States for the first time alongside Kottonmouth Kings and Deuce. In August 2013 the band made an appearance at Wacken Open Air, as well as on the Geki Rock Tour in Japan. The band was nominated for the Up And Coming (best newcomer award) at the German Metal Hammer Awards, held in Berlin on 13 September 2013, which they won.

We Are the Mess, Crystals, The Scene, Rehab and departure of Biesler (2013–2020) 

The band started recording their second album at Kohlekeller Studios together with producer Kristian Kohlmannslehner in autumn of 2013. The album, We Are the Mess, was released on 10 January 2014 via Redfield Records and Warner Music Japan. The band played five release shows in Germany supported by Annisokay. We Are the Mess peaked in 8th place on Germany's official long-play charts and in 64th place in Austria. The band toured in Japan to promote their album. In March of that year, the band toured Europe supported by Iwrestledabearonce, Her Bright Skies and To the Rats and Wolves.

In August 2019, the band released the single "Hurricane" from their fifth studio album. The album, Rehab, was released on 1 November 2019. Following the release of Rehab, the band embarked on their Rehab European Tour 2019.

On 12 February 2020, the band announced through their social media appearances that the previous singer "Sushi" would be leaving the band. "Sushi" went on to start a new project called "Ghostkid".

Introduction of Sallach, international success, name change, and Tekkno (2020–present) 
On 24 April 2020, frontman Kevin Ratajczak announced on YouTube that the search for a new singer was over. After an application phase, a video followed on 4 June 2020, announcing that Nico Sallach (former lead singer of the band To the Rats and Wolves) would be the new lead singer of the band. On 19 June 2020, the band released the song "Hypa Hypa". On 24 July 2020, the band released the song "Hate/Love". On 11 September 2020, the band released the EP MMXX.

On 3 September 2021, the band released the song "We Got the Moves". On 3 December 2021, the band released the song "Pump It". On 6 December 2021, the band announced via their Twitter account that they submitted "Pump It" into the German national selection for the Eurovision Song Contest 2022, but ultimately were not included in the final list of participants.

On 22 December 2021, the band announced through Instagram that they were removing old songs from all platforms due to offensive lyrics and that they were reconsidering the band's name. On 9 March 2022, they announced that they would be called Electric Callboy from now on. The band changed the word 'Eskimo' to 'Electric' because it can be seen as a derogatory name for the Inuit and Yupik people in Alaska. They subsequently re-released the artwork from their previous albums with their new name.

On 8 April 2022, the band released their first song under their new name, "Spaceman", featuring rapper Finch. On 15 April 2022, Electric Callboy announced their new upcoming studio album, Tekkno, which was released on 9 September 2022, and featuring the previously-released singles "We Got the Moves" and "Pump It", along with "Spaceman".

On 8 July 2022, the band released a song called "Fckboi", with the American metalcore band Conquer Divide. On 19 August 2022, the band released the song "Hurrikan". The release date for the album was changed to 16 September 2022.

Tekkno entered the German charts at No. 1 in the first week after release, the highest ranking any record of Electric Callboy achieved. In the following week, they had to postpone their UK/France Tour as well as cancelling their participation on the US Level-Up tour with Attack Attack! due to their singer Nico Sallach having a jaw and middle ear infection.

Musical style and influences 
The band's musical style can be described as electronicore, metalcore, melodic metalcore, post-hardcore, comedy rock, dubstep, electro, and EDM. The musicians named bands like Asking Alexandria and Attack Attack! as their musical influences. Their singer stated that the musicians don't feel like being a part of the "hardcore music scene".

The lyrics deal with themes such as getting drunk, parties, and sex. The band call their music "Porno Metal". In an interview with the German magazine FUZE, vocalist Sebastian Biesler said that their lyrics only use clichés in a satirical way. German Metal Hammer magazine published a positive review of the band, writing, "This is why Eskimo Callboy is enjoyable: because they dismiss themselves and let the fun rule".

Band members 

Current members
 Kevin Ratajczak – vocals, keyboards, programming (2010–present)
 Daniel "Danskimo" Haniß – lead guitar (2010–present)
 Pascal Schillo – rhythm guitar, backing vocals (2010–present)
 Daniel Klossek – bass guitar, backing vocals (2010–present)
 David-Karl Friedrich – drums (2012–present)
 Nico Sallach – vocals (2020–present) 

Former members
 Michael "Micha" Malitzki – drums (2010–2012 guest 2022)
 Sebastian "Sushi" Biesler – vocals (2010–2020)

Timeline

Discography

Studio albums

Extended plays

Singles

Music videos

Awards and nominations

German Metal Hammer Awards

!
|-
| 2013
| "N/A"
| Up And Coming (best newcomer award)
| 
|

Impericon Awards

!
|-
|2020
|"Hypa Hypa"
|Best Video
| 
|
|-
|2021
|"We Got the Moves"
|Best Music Video
| 
|

References

External links 

 Official Website (German, English)
 Electric Callboy at MySpace
 Electric Callboy at SoundCloud
 Electric Callboy at YouTube

German metalcore musical groups
Musical groups established in 2010
Electronicore musical groups
Metalcore musical groups
2010 establishments in Germany
Name changes due to the George Floyd protests